The Red Heart (❤️) emoji is an ideogram that is used in communication to express care and as a romantic gesture. It is frequently seen as the most popular emoji in surveys. The emoji was first used in communication by NTT DoCoMo, and its creator is seen as Shigetaka Kurita.

Development and usage history
In the 1990s, NTT DoCoMo released a pager that was aimed at teenagers. The pager was the first of its kind to include the option to send a pictogram as part of the text. The pager only had a single pictogram on its options, which was a heart-shaped pictogram. This is thought to be Kurita's first exposure to the use of digital symbols in text form. The pager received rave reviews in Asia which led to other companies in the region to consider using pictograms in the list of text characters. NTT DoCoMo then released another pager aimed at businesspeople, but this time dropped the heart pictogram from the characters on the pager. Following its release, there was an outcry by users that the pictogram was no longer available and many customers switched to other providers that had now included a heart pictogram in their markup. This led NTT DoCoMo to reverse their decision and include the heart pictogram.

As the emoji became more popular, other heart colours were launched by Unicode. Since then, each heart color has been given its own meaning.

In early 2022, Middle Eastern news publications suggested that sending a Red Heart emoji on WhatsApp in Saudi Arabia could amount to harassment and if convicted, the sender could serve a maximum sentence of two years in jail.

References

Individual emoji
Heart symbols